Grégory Lamboley (12 January 1982) is a French rugby union footballer, currently playing for Stade Toulousain in the Top 14, the top competition of rugby in France. Lamboley has also played for the French national team. His usual position is as a lock or a flanker. Prior to playing for Toulouse he played for Massy. He made his debut for the French national team in 2005 in a match against Scotland. He was educated at the Lycée Lakanal in Sceaux. Whilst at Toulouse he helped them win the Heineken Cup in 2003 when he featured as a replacement.

References

External links 

 RBS 6 Nations profile
 Grégory Lamboley on L'Équipe

1982 births
French rugby union players
Living people
Rugby union flankers
Rugby union locks
France international rugby union players
Stade Toulousain players
Lycée Lakanal alumni